The 1999 Istanbul Summit was the 6th Organization for Security and Co-operation in Europe (OSCE) summit and was held in Istanbul, Turkey from November 18 until November 19, resulting in the adoption of the Istanbul Summit Declaration and the signing of the Charter for European Security. Also in Istanbul, 30 OSCE states signed the Agreement on the Adapted Conventional Armed Forces in Europe Treaty, which amended the 1990 Treaty on Conventional Armed Forces in Europe to reflect the changes since the end of the Cold War. There was a verbal clash between Russia and the West concerning NATO intervention in the Kosovo Conflict and the beginning of the Second Chechen War.

The Transnistria conflict, the Abkhaz–Georgian conflict and the Georgian–Ossetian conflict were also discussed. In the summit, Russia promised to have withdrawn its military forces from Moldova and Georgia by 31 December 2002, which did not happen.

References

Transnistria conflict
Organization for Security and Co-operation in Europe
Diplomatic conferences in Turkey
20th-century diplomatic conferences
1999 in international relations
1999 conferences
1990s in Istanbul